One Among the Living is the fourth studio album by the Canadian rock band Mystery. Prior to recording this album Patrick Bourque had been replaced by François Fournier, Benoît Dupuis rejoined the band as keyboardist after a 12-year absence, and Dean Baldwin joined as a second guitarist.

Background

As with other Mystery songs, "One Among the Living" and "Between Love and Hate" were two songs that had been written years prior, with "One Among the Living" being written around the time of ''Destiny?.

Track listing

Personnel
Mystery
 Benoît David - lead vocals
 Michel St-Père - guitars, keyboards
 Steve Gagné - drums

Mystery live band members, session musicians
 Benoît Dupuis - keyboards (tracks 1, 2, 11, 12, 14)
 Dean Baldwin - guitars (track 13)
 François Fournier - bass (track 12), Taurus pedals

Additional musicians
 Antoine Fafard - bass (tracks: 2-4, 6-11, 14)
 Claire Vezina - back vocals (track 14)
 Daryl Stuermer - guitar solo (track  14)
 John Jowitt - bass guitar (track 5)
 Oliver Wakeman - moog solo (track 5)
 Richard Lanthier - bass (track 13)

Release information
 CD - Unicorn Digital - UNCR-5080 - 2010

References

2010 albums
Mystery (band) albums